East German vehicle registration plates were issued in the former German Democratic Republic between 1953 and 1990. Vehicles whose cylinder capacity was less than 50 cm3 were exempt from registration.

The plates remained legal until the end of 1993, when all vehicles had to be re-registered to the West German system.

Design

The plates' appearance remained largely constant during the 37 years in which they were issued. Black alphanumerics rendered in a condensed version of DIN 1451 were used (although other fonts have also been observed), with the first letter indicating the bezirk (the German word for 'district') where the vehicle was registered.  Between 1953 and 1974, the format of these plates was XX ##-##, where X is any letter in the range A-Z, and # is a digit between 0 and 9 – although a numerical prefix and/or suffix of '00' was disallowed.

In response to the dramatic increase in the number of vehicles on East German roads, the design was revised in October 1974 to include an additional serial letter, albeit at the cost of the initial digit. The new format became: XXX #-##. Under this system, '0' was a permitted prefix digit, but the combination '0-00' was disallowed.

List of district identifiers
The prefixes were allocated alphabetically to each region, from North to South. The letters G, J, Q, and W were not used.

The prefixes HJ, KZ, SA, and SS were not issued, due to their Nazi connotations.

Special Plates

GST

Vehicles belonging to the Gesellschaft für Sport und Technik (en: Sport and Technology Association), or GST for short, were allocated plates with only a single prefix letter denoting the district of registration.

Military
Vehicles belonging to the Nationale Volksarmee (en: National People's Army) were issued plates bearing the VA (Volksarmee) prefix, whilst those of the Grenztruppen (en: Border Troops), and Grenzschutz (as of 1990) received the GT and GS prefixes, respectively.

Volkspolizei

Vehicles of the People's Police (East German militia) were furnished with plates bearing the VP prefix. Although they were identical in appearance and format to other East German plates, Volkspolizei plates followed a different system.

The first two digits after the VP prefix identified the district (or bezirk) where the vehicle was stationed. Incidentally, these (and diplomatic registrations) were the only plates where it was legal to use '00' as prefix digits.

The table below illustrates the numerical codes used:

Diplomatic & Foreign National

Vehicles belonging to diplomats and embassy staff were issued plates which featured white alphanumerics on a reddish-brown background, whilst those of foreign nationals were the more familiar white-on-blue. In both cases, the two-letter prefix identified the vehicle's function, whilst the first two digits indicated the country it belonged to. Diplomatic plates always began with the letter C, whilst those assigned to foreigners were prefixed with Q.

The following table lists these prefixes:

List of numerical embassy codes:

References

German Democratic Republic
Transport in East Germany

de:Kfz-Kennzeichen (DDR)#Kennzeichen in der DDR von 1953 bis 1990